Saribia is a genus of butterflies in the family Riodinidae.

Species
Saribia decaryi  (Le Cerf, 1922) 
Saribia ochracea Riley, 1932
Saribia perroti Riley, 1932
Saribia tepahi  (Boisduval, 1833)

References

External links
  images  representing Saribia at Consortium for the Barcode of Life

Nemeobiinae
Butterfly genera
Taxa named by Arthur Gardiner Butler